Chaykino (Çaykin) is a rural locality (a khutor) in Shafranovsky Selsoviet, Alsheyevsky District, Bashkortostan, Russia. The population was 163 as of 2010. There are 3 streets.

Geography 
Chaykino is located 23 km southwest of Rayevsky (the district's administrative centre) by road. Shafranovo is the nearest rural locality.

References 

Rural localities in Alsheyevsky District